Disappeared statues in Tehran refers to a series of robberies committed during the months of April and May 2010 in Tehran, Iran, when twelve bronze statues of national heroes disappeared from public places for unknown reasons. Tehran officials treated the incidents as theft, while others have suggested that it may have been a deliberate removal by the government or religious groups. In June 2010, Tehran municipality officials asked the sculptors to remanufacture the sculptures.

Mohammad Bagher Ghalibaf, who at the time was the mayor of Tehran, stated in an announcement that Iranian police were pursuing the issue.

List of missing statues

References

Theft
Buildings and structures in Tehran
2010 crimes in Iran
Sculpture
Statues in Tehran
21st century in Tehran